Samuel Franklin Narron (born July 12, 1981) is an American former professional baseball pitcher and current pitching coach for the Potomac Nationals. He pitched in one game in Major League Baseball (MLB) for the Texas Rangers in the  season. He was selected by the Texas Rangers in the 15th round of the 2002 MLB draft. On April 28, 2008, Narron hit a home run for the Huntsville Stars, the first home run on the season for a pitcher. He is the grandson of former major league catcher and coach Sam Narron and cousin of catcher and manager Jerry Narron.

College career
Narron attended East Carolina University, where he played college baseball for the Pirates.  He was named to the All-Tournament Team in the 2002 Conference USA Tournament, which East Carolina won.

Professional career
Narron was drafted by the Texas Rangers in the 15th round of the 2002 amateur draft. He began that season with their Rookie League affiliate, the Pulaski Rangers. In , he was promoted to the Class A-Advanced Stockton Ports. The following season, he advanced to the Double-A Frisco RoughRiders, where he was named to the Texas League mid-season All-Star team, and the Triple-A Oklahoma RedHawks. Narron was also called up the major league Rangers for one game.

On September 24, 2004, Narron was claimed off waivers by the Milwaukee Brewers. He later underwent Tommy John surgery and missed the entire  season. In , he played with the Double-A Huntsville Stars. After starting 2008 in Huntsville, he was promoted to the Triple-A Nashville Sounds on May 16, 2008. He spent the remainder of 2008 and the entire 2009 season with Nashville before becoming a minor league free agent after the season.

On January 14, 2010, Narron signed a minor league contract with the Detroit Tigers he received an invite to spring training. He was later released and signed a minor league contract with the Brewers. He filed for free agency after the 2010 season, but later signed a new minor league contract with Milwaukee for 2011.

Post playing career
He retired from playing following the 2011 season and was a pitching coach for the Hagerstown Suns, a minor league baseball team.

Narron was named as the Pitching coach for the Potomac Nationals for the 2018 season.

References

External links

1981 births
Living people
Azucareros del Este players
Baseball coaches from North Carolina
Baseball players from North Carolina
Brevard County Manatees players
Camden Riversharks players
East Carolina Pirates baseball players
Frisco RoughRiders players
Gigantes del Cibao players
Huntsville Stars players
Leones del Caracas players
American expatriate baseball players in Venezuela
Leones del Escogido players
American expatriate baseball players in the Dominican Republic
Major League Baseball pitchers
Minor league baseball coaches
Nashville Sounds players
Oklahoma RedHawks players
People from Goldsboro, North Carolina
Pulaski Rangers players
Scottsdale Scorpions players
Stockton Ports players
Texas Rangers players